Hussain Al-Sheikh (born 8 December 1990) is a Saudi footballer who plays for Al-Jandal as a midfielder.

Honours
Al-Khaleej
First Division runner-up: 2013–14

Al-Qadsiah
MS League runner-up: 2019–20

Al-Fayha
MS League runner-up: 2020–21

References

External links 
 

1990 births
Living people
Mudhar Club players
Khaleej FC players
Ohod Club players
Al-Qadsiah FC players
Al-Sahel SC (Saudi Arabia) players
Al-Fayha FC players
Al-Taraji Club players
Al Jandal Club players
Saudi Arabian footballers
Saudi First Division League players
Saudi Professional League players
Saudi Fourth Division players
Saudi Second Division players
People from Qatif
Association football midfielders
Saudi Arabian Shia Muslims